Pervez Malik (1937 – 18 November 2008) was a Pakistani film director.  He was the director of Pakistan's first platinum jubilee film, "Armaan" (1966). He directed more than 20 films, mostly in Urdu language, and received excellent reviews for many of his films from both film critics and the public.

Early life 
Pervez Malik was nine years old when Pakistan became independent in 1947. His family had a background in military service, but he was influenced by his class fellow, Waheed Murad, whose father, Nisar Murad, ran a film distribution business, named Film Arts.  With the passage of time, they both learned the art of making and marketing films from Nisar Murad and his colleagues who were mostly film-industry personalities.  After graduation, both decided to study film-making in the US, but Waheed Murad was his parents' only child and couldn't be allowed to go away to the US for four years. So Pervez Malik went alone while Waheed Murad was admitted to Karachi University to pursue his second highest passion, English Literature. Pervez Malik received his master's degree in film-making from University of Southern California in Los Angeles and returned to Pakistan in 1963.

Film career 

After returning, he joined the country's most widely circulated English language magazine, Eastern Film, as assistant editor. During this period, Waheed Murad had already produced his own two films under the banner of his father's Films Art. When Pervez Malik joined him, they made hit films like Heera Aur Pathar, Armaan (1966) and Ehsaan (1967). Pervez Malik won the prestigious Nigar Award for Armaan and Qurbani (1981) as Best Film Director. During his film career, Pervez almost always wrote his own screenplay. But due to some differences which arose between Waheed Murad and Pervez Malik, Pervez Malik decided to start films with other film heroes like Nadeem and Mohammad Ali. He then never cast Waheed Murad in his films any more.

Some popular films as director
Heera Aur Pathar (1964), Starring: Zeba, Waheed Murad
Armaan (1966) (a Platinum Jubilee film), Starring: Zeba, Waheed Murad
Ehsaan (1967), Starring: Zeba, Waheed Murad
Doraha (1967), Starring: Shamim Ara, Waheed Murad
Anmol (1973), Starring: Shabnam, Shahid
Pehchan (1975), Starring: Shabnam, Nadeem
Talaash (1976), Starring: Babra Sharif, Nadeem, Shabnam
Pakeeza (1979), Starring: Shabnam, Nadeem
Intikhab (1978) Starring: Shabnam, Mohammad Ali
Hum Dono (1980), Starring: Shabnam, Nadeem
Qurbani (1981), Starring: Shabnam, Nadeem
Kamyabi (1984), Starring: Shabnam, Nadeem
 Hulchal (1985), Starring: Javed Sheikh, Nazan Saatci, Shabana
Gharibon Ka Baadshah (1988)., Starring: Javed Sheikh, Salma Agha

Awards and recognition
Pride of Performance Award by the President of Pakistan in 1992
Nigar Award for Best Director twice for films Armaan (1966) and Qurbani (1981)

Death and legacy
Pervez Malik died on 18 Nov 2008 due to a cardiac arrest having directed over 20 films for the Pakistani film industry. His survivors included two sons Imran and Irfan and a daughter besides his wife.

References

External links
 

Pakistani film directors
USC School of Cinematic Arts alumni
Nigar Award winners
Recipients of the Pride of Performance
1937 births
2008 deaths
Urdu-language film directors
Pakistani expatriates in the United States